Simeon Shterev (born 15 January 1985 in Sofia) is a Bulgarian footballer who plays for Belasitsa Petrich. He is a fast forward, currently playing as a winger. His father Simeon Shterev is a former wrestling champion.

Career
Shterev was raised in Levski Sofia's youth teams. At the age of 18-years old in 2003 he joined Lokomotiv Sofia and signed his first professional contract. However, for this team he played in only 10 matches for two years. In July 2005 he signed with Greek side Messiniakos F.C. In the summer of 2008 Shterev began playing for Belasitsa Petrich.

External links
 footmercato profile

1986 births
Living people
Bulgarian footballers
Association football forwards
FC Lokomotiv 1929 Sofia players
Messiniakos F.C. players
PFC Belasitsa Petrich players
First Professional Football League (Bulgaria) players
Bulgarian expatriate footballers
Expatriate footballers in Greece
Bulgarian expatriate sportspeople in Greece